Events from the year 1700 in France

Incumbents
 Monarch – Louis XIV

Events
 24 March – The Treaty of London is signed between France, England and the Dutch Republic.
 15 November – Louis XIV of France accepts the Spanish crown on behalf of his grandson Philip of Anjou of the House of Bourbon, who becomes Philip V of Spain (in accordance with the will of Charles II of Spain), thus triggering the War of the Spanish Succession (1701–1714).

Births
6 September – Claude-Nicolas Le Cat, surgeon (died 1768) 
21 October – Princess Élisabeth Charlotte of Lorraine (died 1711)
19 November – Jean-Antoine Nollet, clergyman and physicist (died 1770)

Full date missing
Francesco Bartolomeo Rastrelli, architect (died 1771)

Deaths

6 January – Charles-Félix de Galéan, aristocrat and Lieutenant-General (born 1620)
9 August – Jean-Baptiste Tuby, Italian-born sculptor (born 1635)
15 September – André Le Nôtre landscape architect (born 1613)
23 October – Anne Marie de Bourbon, princess (born 1675)
13 November – Louis Guittar, pirate, hanged in London
30 November – Armande Béjart, actress (born 1640)

Full date missing
Monsieur de Sainte-Colombe, composer and violinist (born c.1640)
Jean Castaing, engineer, inventor of the castaing machine

See also

References

1700s in France